Klaas Breeuwer (25 November 1901 – 24 April 1961) was a Dutch footballer. He competed in the men's tournament at the 1924 Summer Olympics.

References

External links
 

1901 births
1961 deaths
Dutch footballers
Netherlands international footballers
Olympic footballers of the Netherlands
Footballers at the 1924 Summer Olympics
Footballers from Zaanstad
Association football forwards
HFC Haarlem players